is a Japanese comedy film directed by Yasujirō Ozu. It is the oldest known surviving film by the director. The film tells of two friends from a university (played by Ichirō Yūki and Tatsuo Saitō) who vie for the attention of the same girl (Junko Matsui) during a skiing trip.

Cast

Ichirō Yūki as Bin Watanabe (a student)
Tatsuo Saitō as Shūichi Yamamoto (a student)
Junko Matsui as Chieko
Chōko Iida as Chieko's mother
Eiko Takamatsu as Landlady
Shōichi Kofujita as Shōji (her son)
Ichirō Ōkuni as Professor Anayama
Takeshi Sakamoto as Professor
Shin'ichi Himori as Hatamoto (a student)
Fusao Yamada as Kobayashi (a student)
Chishū Ryū as Student

References

External links

Days of Youth at Ozu-san.com

1929 films
Films directed by Yasujirō Ozu
Japanese silent films
Shochiku films
Japanese black-and-white films
Films with screenplays by Yasujirō Ozu
Japanese comedy films
1929 comedy films